Marcela de San Félix (1605–1688) was a nun who worked as a prelate, a teacher to novices, and housekeeper among several other jobs.  However, Sor Marcela was also a poet, an actress as well as a dramatist.

For many women of the Middle Ages, the Renaissance, and Baroque periods to live a life completely retired from the world implied that they could live a life not only fully committed to God, but it also meant that they were able to devote time to their own writing, to their community and perhaps they could even have a place in the administration of their own convents. This is exactly what happened to Marcela del Carpio.  

She was the illegitimate daughter of Lope de Vega and the actress Micaela de Luján. She adopted the name of Marcela de San Félix and lived in the convent of St. Ildefonse of the Discalced Trinitarians in Madrid since age sixteen until she was eighty-two years old.

References

External links
 Complete work of Sister Marcela de San Félix online
 Biography by Georgina Sabat

1605 births
1688 deaths
17th-century Spanish women writers
17th-century writers
Spanish dramatists and playwrights
Spanish women dramatists and playwrights
Spanish women poets
17th-century Spanish nuns
Trinitarians